Paul Smith (born 25 January 1976) is an English former professional footballer who played as a midfielder.

He notably played in the Football League for Lincoln City where he made 157 league appearances, scoring 18 goals. He later played at Non-League level for Ilkeston Town,  Sheffield and Glapwell.

Career
A fast and tricky winger, Paul began his career with Hastings Town before being snapped up for £50,000 by Nottingham Forest. He failed to make the first team at Forest and moved to Lincoln City in December 1997. His time at Lincoln City was ended by a back injury which forced his retirement from the professional game.
   
In August 2004, Paul came out of retirement to link up with his old Lincoln City manager Phil Stant who was now in charge of Ilkeston Town. However, his back injury continued to trouble him and in January 2005 he once again retired. However, he underwent extensive treatment and was able to resume his career with Ilkeston in August 2005. For the 2006–2007 season, Paul moved on to Sheffield but his injury jinx struct again when he dislocated his shoulder during his debut against Mickleover Sports and the injury would keep him out for the remainder of the season. In August 2007, Smith moved to Glapwell, helping the team to promotion before leaving at the end of the season due to work commitments.

References

External links

Retires from Ilkeston, Jan 2005
Returns to Ilkeston, Aug 2005
Report of Sheffield debut, Aug 2006

1976 births
Living people
Sportspeople from Hastings
English footballers
Association football midfielders
Nottingham Forest F.C. players
Lincoln City F.C. players
Ilkeston Town F.C. (1945) players
Sheffield F.C. players
Hastings United F.C. players
Glapwell F.C. players
English Football League players
Northern Counties East Football League players